Ampanefy is a rural municipality in Analamanga Region, in the  Central Highlands of Madagascar. It belongs to the district of Antananarivo-Atsimondrano and its populations numbers to  19,135 in 2019.

Rivers
The municipality is bordered by the river Sisaony that flooded the town in 1956, 1987, 1994 and 2015.

8 Fontany (villages) are part of Anpanefy: Behoririka, Ampandrorarana, Ambohidronono, Ampanefy, Ambohitsoa, Isaingy, Antalata and Malaho.

Agriculture
Rice, beans, tomatoes and potatoes are the most grown agricultural products.

References

mg:Ampanefy

Populated places in Analamanga